Kamaru is an Austronesian language spoken on Buton Island, Southeast Sulawesi, Indonesia. It belongs to the Wotu–Wolio branch of the  Celebic subgroup.

References 

Wotu–Wolio languages
Languages of Sulawesi